Grant Martin (born 26 June 1999) is a South African cricketer. He made his List A debut for North West in the 2018–19 CSA Provincial One-Day Challenge on 11 November 2018.

References

External links
 

1999 births
Living people
South African cricketers
North West cricketers
Place of birth missing (living people)